Albion station is a train station in Albion, Michigan, served by Amtrak's Wolverine line. Baggage cannot be checked at this location; however, up to two suitcases in addition to any "personal items" such as briefcases, purses, laptop bags, and infant equipment are allowed on board as carry-ons. Amtrak does not provide ticketing or baggage service at this station, which is served by two trains daily.

History
The current Albion station house was built in 1882 by the Michigan Central Railroad, which originally ran through town in 1844. The station also had a freight house. Ten years earlier Albion had competition when the Lake Shore and Michigan Southern Railway arrived and added its own station, which operated until the 1920s. 

The red brick depot is a well-preserved example of a Victorian station with earlier Italianate details, such as three sided bays with fancy double brackets supporting the eaves. Colored and glazed brick in shades of white form two beltcourses that encircle the structure. Plain pilasters divide the window bays, each of which features deep corbelling. The trackside bay is topped by a gable with bargeboard and woodwork associated with the Eastlake decorative style. Wrought-iron fencing is found along the ridge of the roof, while two prominent chimneys with corbelling crown the structure. 

The Albion station was abandoned in 1971, when Amtrak consolidated all cross-country passenger rail service within the United States. However it was restored to its original condition by local community groups in the mid-1980s and currently serves as both a bus and train station. The freight house was also restored and converted into a local sports bar known as Davan's, which has since closed.

References

External links

Amtrak Stations Database
Albion Depot (Michigan Passenger Stations)
Albion Station (Michigan's Internet Railroad History Museum)

Amtrak stations in Michigan
Former Michigan Central Railroad stations
Railway stations in the United States opened in 1882
Albion, Michigan
Transportation buildings and structures in Calhoun County, Michigan
1882 establishments in Michigan
Michigan Line